Quinn Weng (born 20 April 1979) is a Taiwanese-Canadian mezzo-soprano singer and is the lead vocalist of the power metal band Seraphim. She joined the band replacing the singer Pay Lee in 2004.

Discography

With Seraphim
Ai (愛) (2004) - Japanese version, the bonus song "My" was recorded by Quinn Weng Rising (日出東方) (2007)

With Beto Vazueqz Infinity
Flying Towards the New Horizon (2006) - Lead & backing vocals on track 9 'She Is My Guide'

References

External links
Seraphim official website

1979 births
Living people
Women heavy metal singers
Musicians from Kaohsiung
21st-century Taiwanese singers
21st-century Taiwanese women singers